Martin-Église is a commune in the Seine-Maritime department in the Normandy region in northern France.

Geography
A village of light industry and farming situated by the banks of the river Arques in the Pays de Caux, immediately to the southeast of Dieppe, at the junction of the D1, the D54 and the D100 roads.

Heraldry

Population

Places of interest
 An obelisk commemorating the battle of Arques, inaugurated in 1827 by the Duchesse de Berry.
 The eighteenth-century château de Thibermont.
 The church of St.Martin, dating from the twelfth century.
 The sixteenth-century stone cross.
 A fourteenth-century bridge.
The British War Cemetery in nearby Arques-la-Bataille.
Some ancient ruins at Chateau d'Arques-la-Bataille in nearby Dieppe.

See also
Communes of the Seine-Maritime department

References

External links

 Official commune website 

Communes of Seine-Maritime